Kyiv Military Aviation Engineering Academy in Kyiv, Ukraine was one of the leading military university-level institutions and research centers of the Soviet Union for the preparation of highly qualified engineers of various specialties for the Soviet Air Forces and Soviet Air Defence Forces. After the breakdown of the Soviet Union, it became the main (and only) military school in Ukraine, preparing engineering and logistics officers for the Ukrainian Air Force.

All educational programs had five-year duration and graduates were granted a qualification and a degree of military engineer (corresponding to the western level from Bachelor to Master of Engineering). The same educational programs were used at the Zhukovsky Air Force Engineering Academy.

History 
It was founded on September 1, 1951 as the Kyiv Higher Engineering Radio-Technical College of the Soviet Air Force.

The academy had a very high reputation; competition for admission was 15 applicants per place. It had academic councils which were awarding Doktor nauk and Candidate of Sciences (Ph.D) degrees.

The academy had two locations. The main academic campus was located at 30 Vozdukhoflotskii Avenue in a massive three-story building built in the 1910s, and a second building on Hryhoriia Andriuschenka Street. In addition, the academy had a training airfield near the Kyiv International Airport (Zhuliany). About a dozen planes and helicopters of various types were available there for engineering practice. The flights were not performed. Later, the training airfield was used to establish the Ukraine State Aviation Museum.

On July 3, 2000, the military institution has ceased to exist as such, has been reorganized, the staff and students were relocated to the Air Force University at Kharkiv. The main academic building now houses the Ivan Chernyakhovsky National Defense University of Ukraine.

Faculties
1 -  Aircraft and Engines
2 -  Aviation Weapons
3 - Aviation Equipment (electrical, hydraulic, etc.)
4 -  Avionics
5 - Foreign military specialists (primarily from African countries)
6 - Studies by correspondence
The faculties #1 and #2 admitted officers who previously completed training at the three-year technical military colleges and had experience of service in the Air Force. The faculties of Aviation Equipment and Avionics accepted high school graduates.

Commanders 
Ivanov, AF (IV.1951 - II.1954) Иванов А. Ф.
Bondarenko II (II.1954-VIII.1962) Бондаренко И. И.
Maksimov, NA (VI.1962-X.1975) Максимов Н. А.
Saints KF (X.1975-IV.1976) Угодников К. Ф.
Chelyshev KB (V.1976 - VII.1990) Челышев К. Б.
Gulyaev, VV (from VII.1990) Гуляев В. В.

Notable Faculty and Personnel 

 Alexander Balenko
 Pyotr Chinayev
 Grigory Golikov
 Anatoly Gritsenko
 Vitaly Ivanov
 Feodosy Iotka
 Georgy Kats
 Alexander Karpov
 Alexander Kucherenko
 Emelyan Kondrat
 Alexander Kornev
 Ivan Korovin
 Mark Lanovenko
 Igor Migulin
 Anatoly Nedbaylo
 Vladimir Polupanov
 Viktor Soshnikov
 Vasily Yakovlev

Sample Monographs Published by Faculty
Dudko, G., Reznikov, GB Doppler velocity meters, and drift angle plane. M. The Soviet radio., 1964. -344 pp. (Дудко Г.К., Резников Г.Б. Допплеровские измерители скорости и угла сноса самолета. М. Советское радио. -1964г. -344 с.)
Reznikov, GB Aircraft antenna. "Soviet Radio", Moscow, 1962. - 456 pp. (Резников Г. Б. Самолетные антенны. «Советское радио», Москва, 1962. - 456 с.)
Chinayev P. Self-tuning systems: calculation and design. - Moscow: Mashgiz. - 1963. - 303 pp. (Чинаев П.И. Самонастраивающиеся системы: расчет и проектирование.  - Москва: Машгиз. - 1963. - 303 с.)
Yakovlev VN Microelectronic pulse generators. - Kyiv: Tehnika, 1982. - 208 pp. (Яковлев  В. Н. Микроэлектронные генераторы импульсов .  - Киев : Технiка, 1982. - 208 с.)

References and external links 

 Alumni Social Website
 25th Anniversary of the 1976  Graduation К 25-летию выпуска ФАРЭО КВВАИУ 1976 года

Military academies of the Soviet Union
Soviet Air Forces education and training
Ukrainian Air Force
Universities and colleges in Kyiv
1951 establishments in the Soviet Union